South Mountain or South Mountains may refer to:

Canada
 South Mountain, a village in North Dundas, Ontario
 South Mountain (Nova Scotia), a mountain range
 South Mountain (band), a Canadian country music group

United States

Landforms
 South Mountain (New Haven County, Connecticut), a mountain peak in the Hanging Hills
 South Mountain (New Mexico), a mountain range of New Mexico
 South Mountain (Ashland, New York), in the Catskill Mountains
 South Mountain (Delaware County, New York), in the Catskill Mountains
 South Mountain (Ulster County, New York), in the Catskill Mountains
 South Mountain (West Kill, New York), in the Catskill Mountains
 South Mountain (New York), in the Catskill Mountains
 South Mountain (Maryland and Pennsylvania), a northern extension of the Blue Ridge Mountains
 South Mountain (eastern Pennsylvania), a ridge extending from Allentown to Reading
 South Mountain (La Sal Mountains), a mountain in San Juan County, Utah
 South Mountains (Arizona), in central Arizona
 South Mountains (Nevada/Utah), in White Pine County, Nevada and Juab County, Utah
 South Mountains (North Carolina)

Parks
 South Mountain Park, Arizona, a municipal park in Phoenix
 South Mountain Reservation in Essex County, New Jersey
 South Mountain State Park, Maryland
 South Mountains State Park, North Carolina, in the South Mountains range

Other
 South Mountain, Texas, a town
 "South Mountain Forest", the 1913 designation for a Pennsylvania state forest area that became several state parks including Pine Grove Furnace State Park
 South Mountain Freeway, a proposed part of Arizona State Route 202 in Metropolitan Phoenix
 South Mountain Oil Field, near Santa Paula, California
 South Mountain Railroad (Cumberland), a railway line in Cumberland County, Pennsylvania
South Mountain Iron Company, a Pine Grove Furnace owner that established the South Mountain Railroad
South Mountain Mining and Iron Company, last private owner of the Pine Grove Iron Works
South Mountain Railway and Mining Company, second owner of the South Mountain Railroad
 Battle of South Mountain, a battle of the American Civil War, fought in Maryland

See also
 南山 (disambiguation), places that literally mean South Mountain in several Asian languages
 Southmont (disambiguation)
 Mountain (disambiguation)
 South (disambiguation)